Delta is a census-designated place in the town of Delta, Bayfield County, Wisconsin, United States.

County H and Delta–Drummond Road are two of the main routes in the community.

References

Unincorporated communities in Bayfield County, Wisconsin
Unincorporated communities in Wisconsin